Lord Cavendish is the short form title of Hugh Cavendish, Baron Cavendish of Furness.

The men listed below were sons or brothers of the various Dukes of Devonshire, and were referred to as Lord [Forename] Cavendish as a courtesy title. It is not technically correct to refer to them as Lord Cavendish, without including their forename.

 Lord Henry Cavendish (1673–1700), British politician
 Lord James Cavendish (died 1741), British soldier and politician
 Lord James Cavendish (died 1751) (circa 1707–1751), British politician
 Lord Richard Cavendish (1752–1781), member of the Parliament of Great Britain
 Lord George Augustus Cavendish (died 1794), British politician
 Lord John Cavendish (1732–1796), English politician
 Lord Frederick Cavendish (soldier) (1729–1803), British field marshal and Whig politician
 Lord George Henry Cavendish (1810–1880), member of the United Kingdom Parliament
 Lord Frederick Cavendish (1836–1882), English Liberal politician
 Lord Edward Cavendish (1838–1891), British politician
 Lord Richard Frederick Cavendish (1871–1946), British aristocrat, author, magistrate and a politician
 Lord Hugh Cavendish, Baron Cavendish of Furness (born 1941), Conservative politician and landowner.